Paul Baskis is an Illinois biochemist, who, in the 1980s found a way of synthetically producing oil from industrial and household wastes without expending more energy than is produced. This process was patented, U.S. patent 5,269,947, in 1993. The rights to the patent were acquired by Changing World Technologies.

See also
 Thermal depolymerization
 Changing World Technologies

References

Living people
Year of birth missing (living people)
American biochemists